Get Your Shine On may refer to:
"Get Your Shine On" (Jesse McCartney song)
"Get Your Shine On" (Florida Georgia Line song)